The Wiring Harness Manufacturer's Association is a trade group for American manufacturers of wiring harnesses, electronic cable assemblies, and cord sets, along with their suppliers and distributors. It publishes the widely used standard IPC/WHMA-A-620 Acceptability of Electronic Wire Harnesses and Cables jointly with IPC.

Leadership:

Joe DeMan - Chairman 2022-

Rick Bromm - Chairman 2016-2022

Lyle Fahning - Chairman 2012-2016

External links
 Official website

See also
 IPC, Association Connecting Electronics Industries (formerly the Institute for Printed Circuits)
 IPC/WHMA-A-620, Requirements and Acceptance for Cable and Wire Harness Assemblies

References

Standards organizations in the United States
Trade associations based in the United States